Pinhook or Pin Hook may refer to:

Pin Hook, Indiana
Pinhook, Decatur County, Indiana
Pinhook, Franklin County, Indiana
Pinhook, LaPorte County, Indiana
Pinhook, Lawrence County, Indiana
Pinhook, Wayne County, Indiana
Pinhook, Missouri
Pin Hook, Iron County, Missouri
Pin Hook, Alabama
Crittenden, Kentucky, formerly known as Pin Hook
Pin Hook, Texas

See also
 Pinhook Corners, Oklahoma